Romain Inez (born April 30, 1988 in Caen) is a French former professional footballer who last played as a defender for Seraing.

Career
Inez began his career at Caen where he made 5 Ligue 2 and 20 Ligue 1 appearances. Whilst at Caen he spent time out on loan at Cherbourg during 2008–2009 season. Inez made his first team debut for Caen in a 2–1 away win over SC Bastia on 14 August 2009, playing full 90 minutes. He made his Ligue 1 debut on 15 August 2010 in a game against Olympique Lyonnais.

In 2012, Inez moved to Metz, where he helped the team gain promotion to the Ligue 2 a year later. In the following season he was dropped to the bench, making only nine starts in his second campaign at Stade Saint-Symphorien.

Botev Plovdiv
On 9 September 2014, Inez signed as a free agent with Bulgarian side Botev Plovdiv on a two-year deal.

Inez made a debut in A Grupa on 20 September. He came on as a 34-minute substitute to replace the injured Plamen Nikolov during the 1-1 draw with Marek Dupnitza. Three days later, on 23 September, he was in the starting lineup for the 0-4 away win against Lokomotiv Mezdra in the first round of the Bulgarian Cup. At the end of the same week, on 27 September, he was included in the starting lineup again for the 2-0 win in the derby game versus Lokomotiv Plovdiv. This was his debut in front of the extraordinary Botev Plovdiv crowd at their home stadium.

Inez did not play in any official games in 2015 due to an injury. On 24 April his contract with Botev Plovdiv was terminated.

Career statistics

Club

References

External links

1988 births
Living people
French footballers
Ligue 1 players
Ligue 2 players
First Professional Football League (Bulgaria) players
AS Cherbourg Football players
Stade Malherbe Caen players
LB Châteauroux players
FC Metz players
Botev Plovdiv players
FC Petrolul Ploiești players
Expatriate footballers in Bulgaria
Footballers from Caen
Association football defenders